The Mount Lyell shrew (Sorex lyelli) is a species of mammal in the family Soricidae.  It is named for Mount Lyell in Yosemite National Park, the area where the shrew has been most commonly found.

Range
It is endemic to a small area of the Sierra Nevada in California, United States. It is typically found in sub-alpine riparian areas near fast-running streams.

Description
The skull contains 32 teeth.

References

Sorex
Fauna of the Sierra Nevada (United States)
Endemic fauna of California
Mammals of the United States
Taxonomy articles created by Polbot
Mammals described in 1902